Sophie Cattani is a French actress. She appeared in more than thirty films since 2001.

Filmography

References

External links 

Year of birth missing (living people)
Living people
French film actresses
21st-century French actresses